Sir Austin Ernest Bide (11 September 1915 – 11 May 2008) was a British chemist and industrialist.

Biography

Bide was born at 3 Blithfield Street, Kensington, on 11 September 1915, the son of Ernest Arthur Bide and his wife, Eliza, née Young. He was brought up by his mother after his father, a gardener who had become a lance bombardier in the Royal Garrison Artillery, was killed in France in October 1918.

After attending Acton County Grammar School, Bide joined the Laboratory of the Government Chemist at age 16, while also studying in the evenings for a chemistry degree. He was awarded a first in 1939. In 1940 he joined Glaxo Laboratories and, as part of the war effort, worked on the synthesis of vitamin B1 and the development of penicillin. In 1944 he was appointed as department head, with responsibility for patents and chemical development, thus beginning his career in management.

In 1951 he was entrusted with supervising the construction of a new factory at Montrose, Angus. Three years later he was back in London, first as deputy company secretary, then company secretary in 1959, and a director in 1963. He became deputy chairman in 1971.

Bide was heavily involved when Beecham launched the biggest ever takeover bid for Glaxo. It was blocked by the Monopolies Commission in 1972 on the grounds that it would damage the UK's research into new drugs. Bide became chairman and chief executive of Glaxo in 1973, and immediately put in place a process of structural reform by rationalising Glaxo’s technical divisions. He retired in 1985 and, controversially, was named life president. Bide had been knighted in 1980.

He then started a second career by becoming deputy chairman of BL, a large and largely failing car manufacturer. He was appointed by Sir Michael Edwardes, by whom he was greatly valued. Even so, he failed to get the whole or parts of the company sold.

Family

On 28 June 1941 he married Irene Ward (b. 22 September 1920), a milliner, and daughter of Ernest Auckland Ward, upholsterer; they had three daughters: Ann {1946), Susan (1951) and Patricia (1958}.
	
Sir Austin Bide died on 11 May 2008 in St Anthony's Hospital, North Cheam, of bronchopneumonia following a stroke; he was survived by his wife and their three daughters.

Lady Irene died on 13 November 2013, aged 93. She was survived by her three daughters and six grandchildren.

References

1915 births
2008 deaths
People educated at Acton County Grammar School
Alumni of Birkbeck, University of London
British chemists
British industrialists
Knights Bachelor
20th-century British businesspeople
20th-century industrialists
21st-century industrialists